The 2005 CEMAC Cup was the second edition of the CEMAC Cup, the football championship of Central African nations

The tournament was held in the Libreville, Gabon.

First round

Group A

Group B

Knockout stage

Chad reached the final after beating hosts Gabon 3-2. The first goal was scored by Hamtouin Djenet (3'), Gaiüs Doumde added the second (10'), while Cyprien Nguembaye added the third (66'). Scorers for Gabon were  René Nsi Akoué (6', pen.) and Serge Mabiala (68'). Cameroon beat Congo 4-3 after penalties shootout. The match had tied 0-0 at the end of full time.

Semi-finals

3rd Place Playoff

Final

References

Details at RSSSF archives

CEMAC Cup
CEMAC
CEMAC
CEMAC